Stratton Lake is a lake in Isanti County, in the U.S. state of Minnesota.

Stratton Lake bears the name of a pioneer settler.

See also
List of lakes in Minnesota

References

Lakes of Minnesota
Lakes of Isanti County, Minnesota